Scientology: The Now Religion is a book on Scientology, written by George Malko. The book was the first full-length analysis of the history surrounding the founding of the Church of Scientology, and L. Ron Hubbard. The author conducted interviews with members, and provides analysis about certain practices. The book was published in 1970 in Hardcover format by Delacorte Press, and then in a paperback edition in 1971, by Dell Publishing. The Church of Scientology fought to prevent the sale of the book.

According to Jon Atack in A Piece of Blue Sky, "author George Malko wrote that 'Hubbard's extensive discussion of things sexual, his concern with abortions, beatings, coitus under duress, flatulence which causes pressure on the foetus, certain cloacal references, all suggest to me a fascination which borders on the obsessive, as if he possessed a deep-seated hatred of women. All of them are being beaten, most of them prove to be unfaithful, few babies are wanted.'"

Sued by Church of Scientology

In the 1970s, the Church of Scientology sued Dell Publishing and George Malko for defamation. The defendants were denied summary judgment when Dell republished the book in paperback form without further investigation, despite receiving a signed statement by a person named in the book denying certain allegations pertaining to him. Dell later paid a legal settlement and did not release the book again in a printed format.

Attempt by Church of Scientology to ban book

In 1974, the Church of Scientology of Canada attempted to ban the book in libraries in Canada on the grounds that they were defamatory. In June 1974, libraries were advised that if they did not remove four books from their shelves — Scientology: The Now Religion (Malko), Inside Scientology (Kaufman), The Scandal of Scientology (Cooper), and The Mind Benders (Vosper) — they would be named in a lawsuit.  Two library boards in Ontario, Canada had been served with writs.

After obtaining out-of-court settlements of $7,500 and $500 (USD) and apologies from the publishers of two of the works (Dell Publishing and Tower Publications), the Church of Scientology further threatened to sue any library or bookstore that carried the books.  After certain libraries in Canada refused to remove the books from their shelves, they were sued by the Church.  One Canadian library reported the theft of a book critical of Scientology from its shelves.  These incidents were later reported in a chronological timeline of censorship in British Columbia.

According to used book-sellers, people associated with Scientology have attempted to get copies of the book removed from online marketplaces claiming undefined trademark infringements. They have been instructed to remove their listings of this title by online selling sites after having received reports of "trademark infringement from the rights owner,"  even though the copies in question have been in circulation for nearly 50 years. The claims of infringement originate from an L.A. publisher of L. Ron Hubbard's Dianetics and Scientology Materials, suggesting that the charge is an attempt to censure the content.

See also 
 Bibliography of books critical of Scientology
 Scientology and law

References

External links 
 Read this book at Open Library

1970 non-fiction books
Books about Scientology
Books critical of Scientology
1970 in religion